Alain Charmey (born 14 June 1952) is a Swiss former freestyle swimmer. He competed in the men's 400 metre freestyle at the 1972 Summer Olympics.

References

External links
 

1952 births
Living people
Olympic swimmers of Switzerland
Swimmers at the 1972 Summer Olympics
Place of birth missing (living people)
Swiss male freestyle swimmers